The Swing Arcus (arch or rainbow) is a series of German single-place and two-place  paragliders, designed and produced by Swing Flugsportgeräte of Landsberied. In 2016 it remained in production as the Arcus 7.

Design and development
The Arcus was designed as a beginner to intermediate glider.

The design has progressed through seven generations of models, the Arcus 1, Arcus 2002, 3, 4, 5, 6 and 7, each improving on the last. The models are each named for their approximate projected wing area in square metres or their relative size.

The Arcus 3 series was introduced in 2003 and included the Arcus XL Twin, a two-place tandem glider for flight training.

More than 8,500 Arcus gliders have been sold, making it one of the most produced paragliders.

Variants

Arcus 1
Arcus 1 S
Small-sized model for lighter pilots. The glider model is Deutscher Hängegleiterverband e.V. (DHV) 1-2 GH certified.
Arcus 1 M
Mid-sized model for medium-weight pilots. The glider model is DHV 1 GH certified.
Arcus 1 L
Large-sized model for heavier pilots. The glider model is DHV 1 GH certified.
Arcus 1 XL
Extra large-sized model for even heavier pilots. The glider model is DHV 1-2 GH certified.
Arcus 1 XL Twin
Designed as a tandem glider for flight training. The glider model is DHV 1-2 GH certified.

Arcus 2002
Arcus 2002 S
Small-sized model for lighter pilots. The glider model is DHV 1-2 GH certified.
Arcus 2002 M
Mid-sized model for medium-weight pilots. The glider model is DHV 1 GH certified.
Arcus 2002 L
Large-sized model for heavier pilots. The glider model is DHV 1 GH certified.
Arcus 2002 XL
Extra large-sized model for even heavier pilots. The glider model is DHV 1-2 GH certified.

Arcus 3
Arcus 3 24
Small-sized model for lighter pilots. The glider model is DHV 1-2 certified.
Arcus 3 26
Mid-sized model for medium-weight pilots. The glider model is DHV 1-2 certified.
Arcus 3 28
Large-sized model for heavier pilots. The glider model is DHV 1-2 certified.
Arcus 3 30
Extra large-sized model for even heavier pilots. The glider model is DHV 1 certified.
Arcus XL Twin
Designed as a tandem glider for flight training. The glider model is DHV 2 certified.

Arcus 4
Arcus 4 22
Extra small-sized model for much lighter pilots. The glider model is DHV LTF 1 certified with and without an accelerator.
Arcus 4 24
Small-sized model for lighter pilots. The glider model is LTF 1 and certified without an accelerator and LTF 1-2 certified with accelerator.
Arcus 4 26
Mid-sized model for medium-weight pilots. The glider model is LTF 1 and certified without an accelerator and LTF 1-2 certified with accelerator.
Arcus 4 28
Large-sized model for heavier pilots. The glider model is LTF 1 and certified without an accelerator and LTF 1-2 certified with accelerator.
Arcus 4 30
Extra large-sized model for even heavier pilots. The glider model is DHV LTF 1 certified with and without an accelerator.

Arcus 5
Arcus 5 22
Extra small-sized model for much lighter pilots. The glider model is LTF 1 and CEN A certified without an accelerator and LTF 1-2 and CEN B certified with accelerator.
Arcus 5 24
Small-sized model for lighter pilots. The glider model is LTF 1 and CEN A certified without an accelerator and LTF 1-2 and CEN B certified with accelerator.
Arcus 5 26
Mid-sized model for medium-weight pilots. The glider model is LTF 1 and CEN A certified without an accelerator and LTF 1-2 and CEN B certified with accelerator.
Arcus 5 28
Large-sized model for heavier pilots. The glider model is LTF 1 and CEN A certified without an accelerator and LTF 1-2 and CEN B certified with accelerator.
Arcus 5 30
Extra large-sized model for even heavier pilots. The glider model is LTF 1 and CEN A certified without an accelerator and LTF 1-2 and CEN B certified with accelerator.

Arcus 6
Arcus 6 22
Extra small-sized model for much lighter pilots. The glider model is LTF 1 and CEN A certified without an accelerator and LTF 1-2 and CEN B certified with accelerator.
Arcus 6 24
Small-sized model for lighter pilots. The glider model is LTF 1 and CEN A certified without an accelerator and LTF 1-2 and CEN B certified with accelerator.
Arcus 6 26
Mid-sized model for medium-weight pilots. The glider model is LTF 1 and CEN A certified without an accelerator and LTF 1-2 and CEN B certified with accelerator.
Arcus 6 28
Large-sized model for heavier pilots. The glider model is LTF 1 and CEN A certified without an accelerator and LTF 1-2 and CEN B certified with accelerator.
Arcus 6 30
Extra large-sized model for even heavier pilots. The glider model is LTF 1 and CEN A certified without an accelerator and LTF 1-2 and CEN B certified with accelerator.
Arcus 6 32
Extra large-sized model for much heavier pilots. The glider model is LTF 1 and CEN A certified without an accelerator and LTF 1-2 and CEN B certified with accelerator.

Arcus 7
Arcus 7 22
Extra small-sized model for much lighter pilots. The glider model is DHV LTF/A and CEN A certified without an accelerator and LTF/B and CEN B certified with accelerator.
Arcus 7 24
Small-sized model for lighter pilots. The glider model is LTF/A and CEN A certified without an accelerator and LTF/B and CEN B certified with accelerator.
Arcus 7 26
Mid-sized model for medium-weight pilots. The glider model is LTF/A and CEN A certified without an accelerator and LTF/B and CEN B certified with accelerator.
Arcus 7 28
Large-sized model for heavier pilots. The glider model is LTF/A and CEN A certified without an accelerator and LTF/B and CEN B certified with accelerator.
Arcus 7 30
Extra large-sized model for even heavier pilots. The glider model is LTF/A and CEN A certified without an accelerator and LTF/B and CEN B certified with accelerator.

Specifications (Arcus 3 28)

References

External links

Arcus
Paragliders